This is a list of anime series, anime films, and anime OVA series broadcast by the Japanese anime satellite television network Animax in its networks across Southeast Asia, Taiwan, Hong Kong, Korea. Meanwhile, Tokusatsu is only available in Korea.

Currently broadcast

Japan

Sources:

North America and Asia
{{columns-list|colwidth=30em|
 07-Ghost
 11 Eyes
 A balaRailgun
 A Place Further Than The Universe
 Accel World
 Ai no Wakakusa Monogatari
 Air Gear
 Alice Academy
 Alien Nine
 Angel Links
 Angel Sanctuary
 Angel Tales
 Area 88
 Asobotto Senki Goku
  Assault Lily Bouquet
 Astro Boy
 Avenger
 Ayakashi: Samurai Horror Tales
 Baby Baachan
 Baccano!
 Baka and Test - Summon the Beasts
 Baka and Test - Summon the Beasts 2
 Bakuto Sengen Daigunder
 Beelzebub
 Big Windup!
 Bincho-tan
 Black Bullet
 Black Butler
 Black Cat
 Black Clover 
 Black Jack
 Black Jack Special: The 4 Miracles of Life
 BlazBlue Alter Memory
 Bleach
 Bleach: Memories of Nobody
 Blend S
 Blood+
 Blood: The Last Vampire
 Brain Powered
 Buso Renkin
 By the Grace of the Gods
 Captain Tsubasa
 Captain Tsubasa: Holland Youth
 Captain Tsubasa: Road to 2002
 Cardcaptor Sakura
 Carried by the Wind: Tsukikage Ran
 Le Chevalier D'Eon
 Cells at Work!
 Cells at Work! Code Black
 Chibi Maruko-chan
 Chihayafuru
 Chobits
 Chrome Shelled Regois
 City Hunter
 Clamp School
 Classroom of the Elite 
 Clockwork Fighters Hiwou's War
 Colour Cloud Palace
 La Corda D'Oro ~primo passo~
 Cosmic Baton Girl Comet-san
 Cowboy Bebop
 Cyborg Kuro-chan
 Cyborg 009
 D.N.Angel
 The Daichis - Earth Defence Family
 Daigunder
 Darker than BLACK
 Date A Live III
 Detective Conan
 Digimon Adventure
 Digimon Adventure 02
 DNA2
 Dokkiri Doctor
 Dragon Ball
 Dragonaut The Resonance
 Dragonar Academy
 DT Eightron
 Eight Clouds Rising
 Emma: A Victorian Romance
 Emma: A Victorian Romance Second Act
 Escaflowne: The Movie
 Eureka Seven AO
 EX-Driver
 EX-Driver the Movie
 Fairy Tail
 Fancy Lala
 Fantastic Children
 Fate/stay night
 Fena: Pirate Princess
 Flame of Recca
 Fruits Basket
 Full Metal Panic!
 Full Metal Panic? Fumoffu
 Fullmetal Alchemist
 Fullmetal Alchemist: Brotherhood
 Fullmetal Alchemist the Movie: Conqueror of Shamballa
 Fushigi Yugi
 Fushigi Yugi Eikoden
 Fushigi Yûgi - The Mysterious Play
 Future Boy Conan
 Gakuen Alice
 Galaxy Angel
 Galaxy Angel A
 Galaxy Angel Z
 The Galaxy Railways
 Gankutsuou: The Count of Monte Cristo
 Geneshaft
 Getbackers
 Ghost Hunt
 Ghost Stories
 Ginban Kaleidoscope
 Gintama
 Girlish Number
 Glass Fleet
 Golden Kamuy
 Golden Time
 The Gokusen
 Graduation
 Great Teacher Onizuka
 Guilty Crown
 Gunslinger Girl
 .hack//Legend Of The Twilight
 .hack//Roots
 .hack//SIGN
 Haibane Renmei
 Haikyu!!
 Harlock Saga
 Hayate the Combat Butler
 Hell Girl
 Hell Girl Two Mirrors
 Hellsing
 Hellsing Ultimate
 Hikaru no Go
 Hime-sama Goyojin
 Honey and Clover
 Honey and Clover II
 Hoop Days
 Horimiya
 How a Realist Hero Rebuilt the Kingdom
 Hungry Heart - Wild Striker
 Hunter X Hunter (2011)
 I've Been Killing Slimes for 300 Years and Maxed Out My Level
 Idaten Jump
 Ie Naki Ko Remi
 I'm Gonna Be An Angel
 In/Spectre
 Infini-T Force
 Initial D
 Initial D: Fourth Stage
 Initial D: Second Stage
 Inuyasha
 InuYasha the Movie: Affections Touching Across Time
 Inuyasha the Movie 2: The Castle Beyond the Looking Glass
 InuYasha the Movie 3: Swords of an Honorable Ruler
 Inuyasha the Movie 4: Fire on the Mystic Island
 Inuyasha: The Final Act
 JoJo's Bizarre Adventure
 Jubei-chan - Secret of the Lovely Eyepatch
 Jyu Oh Sei
 K
 K-ON!
 Kaichō wa Maid-sama!
 Kakuriyo: Bed and Breakfast for Spirits
 Kamichu!
 Kaze no Stigma
 Kekkaishi
 Keroro Gunso
 Kino's Journey
 Kuroko's Basketball
 Kyo Kara Maoh!
 The Law of Ueki
  Legend of the Galactic Heroes: Die Neue These
 Life with an Ordinary Guy Who Reincarnated into a Total Fantasy Knockout
 Living for the Day After Tomorrow
 Love, Chunibyo & Other Delusions
 Lucky Star
 Lupin The Third
 Magic User's Club
 Magical Meow Meow Taruto
 Magikano
 Mamotte Lollipop
 Maria-sama ga Miteru (2004)
 Maria-sama ga Miteru (2006)
 Maria-sama ga Miteru: Printemps
 Melty Lancer
 Midori Days
 Mitsuboshi Colors
 Mobile Suit Gundam
 Mobile Suit Gundam ZZ
 Mobile Suit Zeta Gundam
 Mushibugyo
 Monkey Typhoon
 Mushoku Tensei: Jobless Reincarnation
 My Hero Academia (only 2 seasons)
 My Next Life as a Villainess: All Routes Lead to Doom! My Senpai Is Annoying My-Hime My-Otome Myriad Colors Phantom World Naruto Nasu: Summer in Andalusia Ninku Nobody's Girl Nodame Cantabile Nura: Rise of the Yokai Clan One Punch Man Orient Osamake: Romcom Where The Childhood Friend Won't Lose Otogi Zoshi Parasyte Persona 4: The Animation Detective School Q Pilot Candidate Please Teacher! The Prince Of Tennis Princess Comet Princess Sarah Princess Tutu Pumpkin Scissors R.O.D the TV Ranma ½ Rave Master Re:Zero - Starting Life in Another World Read or Die Real Girl REC Red Garden Reincarnated as a Sword Remake Our Life! Rent-A-Girlfriend Riddle Story of Devil Romeo x Juliet Ruin Explorers Saber Marionette J Saber Marionette J Again Saber Marionette J to X Sabikui Bisco Sailor Victory Sailor Victory
 Saiyuki Gunlock Saiyuki Reload Sakura Quest Samurai 7 Samurai X: Reflection School Rumble Sgt. Frog Shadows House 
 Shakugan no Shana Shonen Onmyouji Silent Möbius SK8 the Infinity Sky Wizards Academy Slam Dunk Sleepy Princess in the Demon Castle Solty Rei Space Pirate Captain Harlock Space Pirate Captain Herlock The Endless Odyssey Spirit of Wonder Scientific Boys Club Spooky Kitaro Strike the Blood The Story of Saiunkoku Tantei Gakuen Q Taboo Tattoo Tada Never Falls In Love Tears to Tiara Teasing Master Takagi-san (Season 1)
 Texhnolyze The Asterisk War The Day I Became a God The Detective Is Already Dead The Faraway Paladin The Helpful Fox Senko-san The Melancholy of Haruhi Suzumiya The Ryuo's Work Is Never Done! Tokyo Revengers Toward the Terra The Seven Deadly Sins The Tower of Druaga: The Aegis of Uruk The Tower of Druaga: The Sword of Uruk The World's Finest Assassin Gets Reincarnated in Another World as an Aristocrat Toilet-Bound Hanako-kun Trinity Blood Tsubasa: RESERVoir CHRoNiCLE Tsukihime Tsukimichi: Moonlit Fantasy Tweeny Witches Twin Spica Ultra Maniac Urusei Yatsura The Vision of Escaflowne Woodpecker Detective's Office Windy Tales Witch Hunter Robin Wolf's Rain XXXHOLiC Y School Heroes Yakitate!! Japan Yashahime: Princess Half-Demon Yukikaze YuYu Hakusho Zettai Shonen}}

Korea
 Ultraman Orb Kamen Rider Ghost Tokyo RevengersFormerly broadcast

A
 A Certain Magical Index A Certain Scientific Railgun Accel World Acchi Kocchi (also known as Place to Place)
 Angel beats Aikatsu! Aikatsu Stars! Aikatsu Friends! Aikatsu on Parade! Alice Academy Alice and Zoroku Arcana Famiglia Aria The Scarlet Ammo Double A (also known as Hidan No Aria)
 Ayakashi Japanese Classic Horror Anonymous Noise Arpeggio of Blue Steel (蒼き鋼のアルペジオ, Aoki Hagane no Arpeggio)BThe Boondocks Bleach Brynhildr in the Darkness'

C

D

E
Eight Clouds Rising
Emma - A Victorian Romance
Emma - A Victorian Romance: Second Act
 Elmo's World
Eon Kid (鉄拳戦士：アイアン・キッド)
Ergo Proxy
Eureka 7
éX-Driver
éX-Driver - The Movie
Excel Saga
Eyeshield 21 (アイシールド21)

F

G

H

I
Ichigo 100%
Infinite Ryvius
Inari, Konkon, Koi Iroha
Initial D
Invaders of the Rokujyōma!?
I'm Gonna Be An Angel!, also known as I Wanna Be An Angel!
Inuyasha

J
Jigoku Shōjo Futakomori
Jinki: Extend
Jinzo Konchu Kabutoborg VxV
Jubei-chan 2
Jubei-chan the Ninja Girl
Jūsō Kikō Dancouga Nova 
Jyu Oh Sei

K
.  Kamisama kiss (2 seasons)

L

M

N
Nisekoi
Najica
Naruto
Naruto the Movie: Ninja Clash in the Land of Snow
Naruto the Movie 2: Legend of the Stone of Gelel
Naruto the Movie 3: Guardians of the Crescent Moon Kingdom
Naruto: Shippūden
Naruto: Shippūden the Movie
Nasu: Summer in Andalusia
Neon Genesis Evangelion
 Nisekoi (transferred to Aniplus Asia)
Night Head Genesis
Ningyō Animation Licca-chan
Noir
Nuy Pole
Nodame Cantabile

O

Ohayo! Spank
Oku-sama wa Joshi Kōsei (おくさまは女子高生)
One Piece (ワンピース)
Onegai My Melody (おねがいマイメロディ～くるくるシャッフル！～)
Osomatsu kun (おそ松くん)
Otogi Zoshi
Ouran High School Host Club
Outlaw Star
Overman King Gainer

P

R
R.O.D the TV
Ran, The Samurai Girl
Ranma ½
REC
Record of Lodoss War
Remi, Nobody's Girl
Ring ni Kakero
The Rose of Versailles
Rozen Maiden
Ruin Explorers
Rurouni Kenshin
Rurouni Kenshin: Ishin Shishi no Requiem
Rurouni Kenshin: Seishou Hen
Rurouni Kenshin: Tsuioku Hen
Ryūsei Sentai Musumetto (流星戦隊ムスメット)
 Ryo work has never done

S

 Snow White with the Red Hair

T

U
UFO Baby
Ultra Maniac
Urusei Yatsura (also known as Lum, Lamu, The Invader Girl, Those Obnoxious Aliens and Alien Musibat)

Unbreakable Machine-Doll

V
Vampire Hunter D
Vandread
Vandread Gekitouhen
Vandread: The Second Stage
Vandread Taidouhen
Viking
Virgin Fleet
The Vision of Escaflowne
Escaflowne the Movie
Valvrave the Liberator

W
Wakusei Daikaijû Negadon (a.k.a. Negadon: The Monster from Mars)
The World God Only Knows
Wangan Midnight (湾岸MIDNIGHT)
Whistle!
Wild 7
Windy Tales
Winter Sonata
Witch Hunter Robin
Wolf's Rain
World Masterpiece Theater
Ai Shoujo Pollyanna Monogatari
Flanders no Inu
Kon'nichiwa Anne 〜 Before Green Gables
Les Misérables: Shōjo Cosette
Little Women
Porphy no Negai Tabi
Princess Sarah
Remi, Nobody's Girl
Romeo no Aoi Sora

X
X
xxxHolic

Y
Yakitate!! Ja-pan
Yami to Bōshi to Hon no Tabibito
You're Under Arrest
Yokai Watch
Yukikaze
Yumedamaya Kidan (ゆめだまや奇談)
YuYu Hakusho
 Yu-Gi-Oh!
 Yu-Gi-Oh! Duel Monsters
 Yu-Gi-Oh! GX
 Yu-Gi-Oh! 5D's
 Yu-Gi-Oh! Zexal
 Yu-Gi-Oh! Arc-V
 Yu-Gi-Oh! VRAINS

Z
Z.O.E: Dolores, i
Zipang

Notes

References

Animax Japan official website 
Animax Japan's official website - daily program guide 
Animax Japan's official website - weekly program guide 
Animax Japan's official website - program guide download 
Animax Japan official website - featured lineup of the month 
Animax Japan official website - featured new lineup of the month 
Animax Japan official website - featured new lineup of next month

External links
Animax Asia 
Animax Hong Kong 
Animax Taiwan 
Animax Korea 
Animax Germany 

Animax
Animax
Animax